Lake Glenville is a reservoir located 8 miles from Cashiers, North Carolina to the dam and public beach. The headwaters, at Hurricane Creek, are less than 2 miles. It was formed by the damming of the west fork of the Tuckasegee River in 1941. Between 1951 and 2002, it was officially known as "Thorpe Reservoir" after J. E. S. Thorpe, Nantahala Power's first president. It is still listed as such on many maps. The lake bottom plunges as steeply as the mountains that meet the shore. The depth a short distance from the water's edge may register  or more. The lake has  of shoreline and encompasses 1450 total acres. It is a twenty-minute drive from Western Carolina University, and the town of Sylva.

History
During World War II, ALCOA (Aluminum Company of America) needed more electricity to make aluminum for the war effort. In June 1940, Nantahala Power and Light, then owned by ALCOA, began constructing a dam to generate hydroelectric power on the west fork of the Tuckasegee River at Onion Falls. They completed it in late 1941, filling a new lake called Thorpe Reservoir or (present-day) Lake Glenville behind the dam. It encompassed the entire valley north of Cashiers. The town of Hamburg was evacuated and flooded, covering schools, homes, businesses, and farmlands.

References

Glenville
Protected areas of Jackson County, North Carolina
Nantahala National Forest
Bodies of water of Jackson County, North Carolina